The International Organisations Act 2005 (c 20) is an Act of the Parliament of the United Kingdom. Its purpose is to enable the United Kingdom to fulfil a number of international commitments.

Section 1 - Commonwealth Secretariat
This section relates to the Commonwealth Secretariat.

Section 2 - Commonwealth Secretariat Arbitral Tribunal
Section 2 relates to the Commonwealth Secretariat Arbitral Tribunal.

Section 4 - Organization for Security and Co-operation in Europe
This section relates to the Organization for Security and Co-operation in Europe.

Section 5 - Bodies established under Treaty on European Union
This section inserts section 4B of the International Organisations Act 1968.

Section 6 - International Criminal Court
This section amends the International Criminal Court Act 2001.

Section 7 - European Court of Human Rights
This section provides that section 5 of the International Organisations Act 1968 applies to members of the family of a judge of the European Court of Human Rights as it applies to a judge of that court.

Section 8 - International Tribunal for the Law of the Sea
This section provides that the International Tribunal for the Law of the Sea is to be treated, for the purposes of section 1 of the International Organisations Act 1968, as an organisation of which the United Kingdom, or Her Majesty's Government in the United Kingdom, and at least one other sovereign Power, or the Government of such a Power, are members.

Section 11 - Short title, interpretation, commencement and extent
Section 11(3) provides that, except for sections 1 to 3, the Act came into force at the end of the period of two months that began on the date on which it was passed. The word "months" means calendar months. The day (that is to say, 7 April 2005) on which the Act was passed (that is to say, received royal assent) is included in the period of two months. This means that, except for sections 1 to 3, the Act came into force on 7 June 2005.

The International Organisations Act 2005 (Commencement) Order 2005 (S.I. 2005/1870 (C. 80)) was made under section 11(4).

References
Halsbury's Statutes,

External links
The International Organisations Act 2005, as amended from the National Archives.
The International Organisations Act 2005, as originally enacted from the National Archives.
Explanatory notes to the International Organisations Act 2005.

United Kingdom Acts of Parliament 2005